Joseph-François Ducq, a Flemish historical and portrait painter, was born at Ledeghem in 1763. He studied at Bruges, and then under Suvée in Paris, where he obtained the second grand prize in 1800, and a medal in 1810. He also spent a considerable time in Italy, but returned to Bruges in 1815, and became a professor in the Academy. He died at Bruges in 1829. Amongst his chief works are:

Meleager. 1804.
Devotion of a Scythian. 1810.
Marriage of Angelica and Medora. 1812.
Venus emerging from the Sea. (Brussels Museum)
William I., King of the Netherlands. (Bruges Academy.)
Van Gierdergom. (Bruges Academy.)

References
 

1763 births
1829 deaths
19th-century Flemish painters
People from Ledegem
Prix de Rome for painting